Lac-Devenyns is an unorganized territory in the Lanaudière region of Quebec, Canada, part of the Matawinie Regional County Municipality.

It is named after .

See also
List of unorganized territories in Quebec

References

External links

Unorganized territories in Lanaudière
Matawinie Regional County Municipality